Eupithecia gilvipennata is a moth in the family Geometridae first described by Samuel E. Cassino and Louis W. Swett in 1922. It is found along the North American Pacific coast from British Columbia, through Colorado to California and Arizona.

The wingspan is about 25 mm. The forewings are largely black brown with indications of ochreous shading around a small discal dot and at the apex of the wing. The hindwings are dirty white with broad blackish shading along the outer and inner margins. Adults are on wing very early in spring, from late February to early March in central California and from late April to early May farther north.

The larvae feed on the flowers and fruits of Arctostaphylos species, including A. pungens, A. manzanita, and A. viscida  They are cryptically patterned and coloured to match the flowers of their host plant.

References

Moths described in 1922
gilvipennata
Moths of North America